Salerano Canavese is a comune (municipality) in the Metropolitan City of Turin in the Italian region Piedmont, located about  north of Turin.

Salerano Canavese borders the following municipalities: Ivrea, Fiorano Canavese,  Banchette, Samone, and Loranzè.

References

Cities and towns in Piedmont